The 2003–04 season was the 123rd season in the existence of FC Girondins de Bordeaux and the club's 13th consecutive season in the top flight of French football. In addition to the domestic league, Bordeaux participated in this season's edition of the Coupe de France, the Coupe de la Ligue and the UEFA Cup. The season covered the period from 1 July 2003 to 30 June 2004.

Season summary
Without the goals of Pauleta, Bordeaux had a poor season and slipped to 12th in the league. Manager Élie Baup was sacked in October and replaced by former midfielder Michel Pavon, but results failed to improve. However, they did make an impressive run to the UEFA Cup quarter-finals.

First team squad
Squad at end of season

Left club during season

Transfers

Out
 Pauleta - PSG, 10 July, €12,000,000

Competitions

Overall record

Ligue 1

League table

Results summary

Results by round

Matches

Coupe de France

Coupe de la Ligue

UEFA Cup

First round

Second round

Third round

Fourth round

Quarter-finals

Notes and references

Notes

References

FC Girondins de Bordeaux seasons
Bordeaux